Reginald Osmond Scarlett (15 August 1934 – 14 August 2019) was a West Indian cricketer who played in three Tests in 1960.

Reg Scarlett was a strongly-built lower-order batsman and off-spinner (a "mountainous figure of a man" according to Christopher Martin-Jenkins) who played first-class cricket for Jamaica from 1951/52 to 1959/60. In his first eight games to the end of the 1957–58 season he made 150 runs at 13.63 and took 20 wickets at 34.25. In each of Jamaica's two matches against the Marylebone Cricket Club (MCC) in 1953/54 he took four wickets in the first innings. He struck more productive form in mid-1958, taking 14 wickets in two matches against Barbados.

In 1959/60 Scarlett had figures of 5 for 69 against Trinidad and 3 for 107 against British Guiana, and was selected for the First Test against England. He failed in the Test and was replaced by Charran Singh, but scored 72 not out and 59 for Jamaica against the MCC (his only first-class fifties) and took three wickets, and returned to the Test team for the Third and Fourth Tests, but again achieved little.

Scarlett retired from first-class cricket after the series and moved to England, where he spent many years coaching. He established the Haringey Cricket College in Tottenham in North London, which organised cricket training and matches for local boys, several of whom became first-class players. He later became the West Indies Cricket Board's director of coaching.

He co-authored the book 100 Great West Indian Cricketers (1987) with Bridgette Lawrence. He died on August 14, 2019, the day before his 85th birthday.

Scarlett's younger brother Bob played a few games for Jamaica in the 1960s.

References

External links 
 Reg Scarlett at Cricket Archive
 Reg Scarlett at Cricinfo

1934 births
2019 deaths
West Indies Test cricketers
People from Saint Mary Parish, Jamaica
Jamaican cricketers
International Cavaliers cricketers
Jamaica cricketers
Jamaican cricket coaches